"Anything" is a single by English rock band the Damned, released on 6 November 1986 by MCA Records.

Previewing the group's new album of the same name, the song saw a slight move away from the Goth rock of Phantasmagoria, to a more mainstream rock sound. The single received lukewarm reviews, and considering the success of the previous album and "Eloise", its UK Singles Chart peak of No. 32 was seen as a disappointment.

MCA also issued the single in Ireland and Australia.

Track listing
"Anything" (Jugg, Scabies, Vanian, Merrick) - 4:48
"The Year of the Jackal" (Jugg, Scabies, Vanian, Merrick)

12" single: -

"Anything (Another Mix)" (Jugg, Scabies, Vanian, Merrick)
"The Year of the Jackal" (Jugg, Scabies, Vanian, Merrick)
"Thanks for the Night (Rat Mix)" (Sensible)

10" single: -

 "Anything (Yet Another Mix)" (Jugg, Scabies, Vanian, Merrick)
 "Anything (Instrumental)" (Jugg, Scabies, Vanian, Merrick) - 4:48
 "Anything (And Yet Another Mix)" (Jugg, Scabies, Vanian, Merrick)
 "The Year Of The Jackal" (Jugg, Scabies, Vanian, Merrick)

Production credits
 Producer:
 Jon Kelly ("Anything")
 The Damned ("Year of the Jackal")
 Hein Hoven ("Thanks for the Night")
 Musicians:
 Dave Vanian − vocals
 Rat Scabies − drums
 Roman Jugg − guitar, keyboards
 Bryn Merrick − bass

References

External links

1986 singles
The Damned (band) songs
Songs written by Rat Scabies
Songs written by Roman Jugg
Songs written by David Vanian
Songs written by Bryn Merrick
1986 songs